Carl Lauritz Mortensen (2 March 1919 – 1 November 2005) was a Norwegian sailor and Olympic medalist. He was born and died in Oslo. He received a silver medal in the 6 metre class with the boat Elisabeth X at the 1952 Summer Olympics in Helsinki, together with Johan Ferner, Erik Heiberg, Tor Arneberg and Finn Ferner.

References

External links

1919 births
2005 deaths
Norwegian male sailors (sport)
Olympic sailors of Norway
Olympic silver medalists for Norway
Olympic medalists in sailing
Sailors at the 1952 Summer Olympics – 6 Metre
Medalists at the 1952 Summer Olympics
Sportspeople from Oslo